Unterstrass is a quarter in the district 6 in Zürich.

It was formerly a municipality of its own, having been incorporated into Zürich in 1893.

In 1962, the faculty of science of the University of Zürich proposed to establish the Irchelpark campus on the Strickhofareal. The first stage the construction of the university buildings was begun in 1973, and the campus was inaugurated in 1979. The construction of the second stage lasted from 1978 to 1983. The campus also houses the anthropological museum Anthropologisches Museum, and the cantonal Staatsarchiv Zürich. Built in 1901 as Rigiblick restaurant, the former Gastsaal was re-opened as Theater Rigiblick in 1984.

Gallery

References

External links

District 6 of Zürich
Former municipalities of the canton of Zürich